Wendleria is a genus of beetles in the family Buprestidae, containing the following species:

 Wendleria adamantina Bellamy, 1988
 Wendleria bicolor Bellamy, 1988
 Wendleria gloriosa Obenberger, 1924

References

Buprestidae genera